Josef Pieprzyk (born 1949 in Poland) is currently a professor at Queensland University of Technology in Brisbane, Australia.

He has worked on cryptography, in particular the XSL attack. He collaborated in the invention of the LOKI and LOKI97 block ciphers and the HAVAL cryptographic hash function.

External links
Home page

1949 births
Living people
Modern cryptographers
20th-century Polish mathematicians
21st-century Polish mathematicians
Academic staff of Macquarie University
Academic staff of Queensland University of Technology